Afro-Spaniards are Spanish citizens of Sub-Saharan African descent. The term may include Spaniards of Afro-Caribbean and African American descent, but often excludes Black Spaniards of Latin American origin. It almost always excludes Spaniards of North African origin. The specific number of Spaniards of Sub-Saharan Africa origin is unknown due to the fact that the Spanish government does not collect data on ethnicity or racial self-identification.

Defining Afro-Spaniards

There are currently 1,301,296 people residents in Spain who were born in countries of the African continent, excluding the 1,802,810 born in Ceuta, Melilla and the Canary Islands which are Spanish provinces or part of Andalucia such is the case with Ceuta and Melilla. They are geographically located in Africa.

Out of these, 294,343 are Spanish citizens and 1,006,953 are foreign residents. The large majority of these originate in Morocco. There are 934,046 Moroccan born residents in Spain of which 223,590 are Spaniards and 710,457 are foreign residents. However, Moroccans being North Africans, they are usually not considered as Afro-Spaniards unless they are Black Moroccans, or have visible physical features usually associated with Black peoples. Non-Moroccan African-born residents in Spain thus number 367,250 of which 70,753 are Spanish citizens and 296,497 are foreign residents.

According to the national statistics agency, in 2019 there were 361,000 residents in Spain whose mother was born in an African country excluding Morocco. Out of these 91,000 were Spanish citizens.

History

African populations have known to exist continuously in what is now Spain since pre-Roman times, with a major influx of Africans occurring during the Islamic period. African admixtureprimarily Berber and Arab admixture from North Africais dated to the Muslim period of the Middle Age, and averages from 10 to 12% in the south and west to ~3% in the northeast, dropping to close to 0% in a cluster found in the Basque region. Canary Islander Spaniards have significantly higher levels of both North African and Sub-Saharan ancestry, ranging from averages of 14% to 35% and which originates both in the indigenous Guanche people and the subsequent slave trade.

Notable people

Artists and writers
 Juan Latino, poet and Renaissance humanist
 Juan de Pareja, painter of Morisco origin born in Antequera.
 Elvira Dyangani Ose, curator

Explorers and conquistadores 
 Juan Valiente
 Juan Garrido
 Beatriz de Palacios

In entertainment and media

Philanthropists

 Bisila Bokoko

Politicians
 Dolores Johnson Sastre
 Rita Bosaho
 Ignacio Garriga
 Luc André Diouf

In sports

See also

 Afro-Hispanic people
 Fernandino peoples
 Spanish Guinea
 Spanish Equatoguineans
 African immigration to Europe

Sources
 Appiah, Kwame Anthony; Gates, Henry Louis, Jr.(1999). Africana: the Encyclopedia of African and African American Experience. Basic Civitas Books, pp. 1769–1773. .

References

 
Spaniard
Ethnic groups in Spain
Spanish people of African descent
African diaspora in Europe